Philadelphia, Lady Scrope ( Carey; died 1627) was an English aristocrat and courtier.

She was a daughter of Henry Carey, 1st Baron Hunsdon and Ann Morgan. Her brother, Robert Carey, was the governor of Prince Charles from 1605 to 1610.

In 1584, she married Thomas Scrope, 10th Baron Scrope of Bolton, later a Knight of the Order of the Garter. They had one child Emanuel Scrope, 1st Earl of Sunderland.

In November 1593, a page of Lady Scrope, who was lady of the bedchamber, died in the keep at Windsor Castle and Queen Elizabeth considered moving her household for fear of sickness. Lady Scrope took part in the Harefield Entertainment in August 1602, and was given a mask or vizard, as the lines "Want you a mask! Here fortune give you one: Yet nature gives the rose and lily none" were recited.

She was at the queen's bedside near the time of her death. She is mentioned in Elizabeth Southwell's narrative of the queen's final days, as her special confidante. On the queen's death, she passed her ring to her brother Robert Carey, who rode to Scotland to give it to James VI.

On 2 May 1603, Lady Scrope and Anne, Countess of Worcester, Frances, Countess of Kildare, Lady Anne Herbert, Penelope, Lady Rich, Audrey Walsingham and others went to Berwick-upon-Tweed to welcome Anne of Denmark to England, according to the directions of the Privy Council. Anne came to Berwick on the 9 May. Some of the women had travelled into Scotland to meet her ahead of the others. Another group of women, led by Lucy, Countess of Bedford also travelled to Scotland, attempting to gain the new queen's favour.

Thomas Scrope died in 1609. Lady Scrope died on 3 February 1627. They were buried at St Andrews Church, Langar, Nottinghamshire.

References

16th-century English people
Household of Anne of Denmark
Daughters of barons
Wives of knights
1627 deaths